Razambek Salambekovich Zhamalov (born 1 July 1998 in Khasavyurt, Dagestan) is a Russian freestyle wrestler of Chechen ethnicity who competes at 74 kilograms. He claimed the 2020 Individual World Cup when he defeated two-time World Champion Frank Chamizo in the finals. An accomplished athlete, Zhamalov is the reigning and two-time Russian National Champion (finalist in 2021 and in 2019 at 70 kg), the 2019 U23 World and European champion, a two–time Ivan Yarygin Grand Prix medalist (bronze in 2019 at 70kg and silver in 2020) and was the Junior World Championship runner–up at 70 kg in 2018.

Background 
Zhamalov was born and raised in Khasavyurt, Dagestan, coached by Adam Saitiev and Musa Saydulbatalov at the Saitiev Wrestling Academy. He represents both, Dagestan and Chechnya.

Career

2016-2018 
Zhamalov made his senior freestyle debut the same day he became eligible to, as he turned eighteen in July 2016, at the Ali Aliev Memorial, where he placed tenth after going 1–1. On November, he claimed the Intercontinental Cup, with a notable win over defending two-time Asian Champion Daulet Niyazbekov in the finals. In January 2017, he placed ninth at the Golden Grand Prix Ivan Yarygin. On March, he moved up from 61 kg to 66 kg, claimed the Roman Dmitriev Memorial championship and was named the Outstanding Wrestler, after defeating four opponents by the same score of 10–0. On September, he placed eight at the Alexandr Medved Prizes. To close off the year, Zhamalov claimed the Stepan Sargsyan Cup on Armenia in October.

In 2018, he started off by moving up from 65 kg to 70 kg, and on March, he became a two-time Roman Dmitriev Memorial champion. After qualifying via junior tournaments, Zhamalov wrestled at the Russian Nationals of August, where after recording an 8–1 victory, he was defeated in a closely contested 1–2 match against '15 World Champion and eventual '18 World Champion Magomedrasul Gazimagomedov, and then was again defeated by two-time age-group World Champion David Baev in a last-second come-from-behind loss. After his runner-up finish at the Junior World Championships, Zhamalov became a two-time Intercontinental Cup champion, when he defeated the returning champion of the tournament and '10 Military World Champion Aghahuseyn Mustafayev in the finale. He then represented Russia at the Akhmat Kadyrov Cup, where he compiled three five-pointers and one four-pointer for the team. On December, he placed third at the Alans International Tournament, with a lone and close loss to '16 World Champion Magomed Kurbanaliev.

2019 
To start off the year, Zhamalov competed at the Golden Grand Prix Ivan Yarygin of January, where he earned a bronze medal after a loss to returning World Champion Magomedrasul Gazimagomedov and wins over '18 US Open National Champion Jason Chamberlain and two-time age-group World Champion David Baev, the latter becoming the most notable match in the tournament. In March, he became the U23 European Champion at age 20, and in May, he claimed the Ali Aliev Memorial title. On July, he competed at the Russian Nationals, where he made the finals by downing '17 Russian National champion Magomedkhabib Kadimagomedov and '18 Junior European Champion Chermen Valiev, before being defeated by rival David Baev in another epic match, to claim the silver medal. After losing the chance to represent Russia at the World Championships, Zhamalov bumped up to an Olympic weight class (from 70 kg to 74 kg) and went on to win the U23 All-Russia Open Tournament with a win over '18 U23 World Championship medalist Timur Bizhoev in the finals, on September, becoming the 2019 U23 Russian World Teamer. Aged 21, he became the U23 World Champion with five decision victories at the U23 World Championships.

2020 
To start off the year (January), Zhamalov got a series of victories over high level opponents at the Golden Grand Prix Ivan Yarygin, such as '19 European Championship medalist Timur Bizhoev, '19 World Championship runner-up and '19 Asian Champion Nurkozha Kaipanov, and '16 World Champion Magomed Kurbanaliev, before being defeated in the finals by two-time World Champion Magomedrasul Gazimagomedov, to claim the silver medal. After being unable to compete for months due to the COVID-19 pandemic, Zhamalov came back on October to claim the 2020 Russian National Championship, when he defeated '14 World Champion Khetag Tsabolov in the finals. After his championship showdown at the Russian Nationals, Zhamalov was selected as the Russian representative for the '20 Individual World Cup of December (replacement for the World Championships). At the tournament, he compiled a combined score of 21–0 against three opponents to reach the finals, where he faced the accomplished two-time World Champion Frank Chamizo, whom he was able to edge with a comeback win in the last seconds of the match with a two-point takedown, to become the champion of the biggest tournament of his career.

2021 
Zhamalov competed at the Russian National Championships on March, where after dominating '19 International Cup runner-up Magomed Dibirgadzhiev and '16 University World Champion Nabirbek Khizriev, he avenged his last loss from the Golden Grand Prix Ivan Yarygin 2020 to two–time World Champion Magomedrasul Gazimagomedov by points to make the finals. In the finale, he wrestled two-time and reigning World Champion Zaurbek Sidakov, whom he lost to in a close 2–3 match, giving up the 2021 RU Olympic Team Spot.

In April, Zhamalov competed at the European Championships, and after racking up a notable win over Semen Radulov, he was defeated by 2018 U23 World Champion Tajmuraz Salkazanov and two–time World Champion Frank Chamizo, placing fifth. During the tournament, Zhamalov suffered a serious injury that required surgery and months of rest, leaving him out for the year.

2022 
After more than a year without competing, Zhamalov came back to the mat on May 19 at the prestigious Poddubny Wrestling League, where he reached the semifinals before losing to rival David Baev. He came back to pick up a bronze medal. A month later, Zhamalov competed at the Russian National Championships from June 24 to 26, where he reached the crown over a deep bracket with a revenge win over Baev in the semifinals and a win over fellow U23 World Champion and Russian National champion Chermen Valiev in the finale.

Freestyle record

! colspan="7"| Senior Freestyle Matches
|-
!  Res.
!  Record
!  Opponent
!  Score
!  Date
!  Event
!  Location
|-
! style=background:white colspan=7 | 
|-
|Win
|81–13
|align=left| Chermen Valiev
|style="font-size:88%"|3–2
|style="font-size:88%" rowspan=4|June 24–26, 2022
|style="font-size:88%" rowspan=4|2022 Russian National Championships
|style="text-align:left;font-size:88%;" rowspan=4|
 Kyzyl, Russia
|-
|Win
|80–13
|align=left| David Baev
|style="font-size:88%"|9–3
|-
|Win
|79–13
|align=left| Semen Tereshchenko
|style="font-size:88%"|9–2
|-
|Win
|78–13
|align=left| Tumen Bodiev
|style="font-size:88%"|TF 10–0
|-
! style=background:white colspan=7 |
|-
|Win
|77–13
|align=left| Albik Petrosyan
|style="font-size:88%"|TF 10–0
|style="font-size:88%" rowspan=3|May 19–20, 2022
|style="font-size:88%" rowspan=3|2022 Ivan Poddubny Wrestling League
|style="text-align:left;font-size:88%;" rowspan=3|
 Moscow, Russia
|-
|Loss
|76–13
|align=left| David Baev
|style="font-size:88%"|5–6
|-
|Win
|76–12
|align=left| Tazhi Davudov
|style="font-size:88%"|TF 10–0
|-
! style=background:white colspan=7 |
|-
|Loss
|75–12
|align=left| Frank Chamizo
|style="font-size:88%"|1–5
|style="font-size:88%" rowspan=4|April 19–21, 2021
|style="font-size:88%" rowspan=4|2021 European Continental Championships
|style="text-align:left;font-size:88%;" rowspan=4|
 Warsaw, Poland
|-
|Loss
|75–11
|align=left| Tajmuraz Salkazanov
|style="font-size:88%"|5–6
|-
|Win
|75–10
|align=left| Semen Radulov
|style="font-size:88%"|TF 11–1
|-
|Win
|74–10
|align=left| Hrayr Alikhanyan
|style="font-size:88%"|TF 10–0
|-
! style=background:white colspan=7 | 
|-
|Loss
|73–10
|align=left| Zaurbek Sidakov
|style="font-size:88%"|2–3
|style="font-size:88%" rowspan=4|March 11–12, 2021
|style="font-size:88%" rowspan=4|2021 Russian National Championships
|style="text-align:left;font-size:88%;" rowspan=4|
 Ulan-Ude, Russia
|-
|Win
|73–9
|align=left| Magomedrasul Gazimagomedov
|style="font-size:88%"|2–1
|-
|Win
|72–9
|align=left| Nadirbek Khizriev
|style="font-size:88%"|Fall
|-
|Win
|71–9
|align=left| Magomed Dibirgadzhiev
|style="font-size:88%"|TF 10–0
|-
! style=background:white colspan=7 |
|-
|Win
|70–9
|align=left| Frank Chamizo
|style="font-size:88%"|4–2
|style="font-size:88%" rowspan=4|December 16–18, 2020
|style="font-size:88%" rowspan=4|2020 Individual World Cup
|style="text-align:left;font-size:88%;" rowspan=4|
 Belgrade, Serbia
|-
|Win
|69–9
|align=left| Tajmuraz Salkazanov
|style="font-size:88%"|5–0
|-
|Win
|68–9
|align=left| Murad Kuramagomedov
|style="font-size:88%"|6–0
|-
|Win
|67–9
|align=left| Mitch Finesilver
|style="font-size:88%"|TF 10–0
|-
! style=background:white colspan=7 |
|-
|Win
|66–9
|align=left| Khetag Tsabolov
|style="font-size:88%"|5–1
|style="font-size:88%" rowspan=5|October 16–18, 2020
|style="font-size:88%" rowspan=5|2020 Russian National Championships
|style="text-align:left;font-size:88%;" rowspan=5|
 Naro-Fominsk, Russia
|-
|Win
|65–9
|align=left| Timur Bizhoev
|style="font-size:88%"|6–6
|-
|Win
|64–9
|align=left| Magomedmurad Dadaev
|style="font-size:88%"|TF 11–0
|-
|Win
|63–9
|align=left| Saipulla Alibolatov
|style="font-size:88%"|TF 13–2
|-
|Win
|62–9
|align=left| Nikita Suchkov
|style="font-size:88%"|7–2
|-
! style=background:white colspan=7 |
|-
|Loss
|61–9
|align=left| Magomedrasul Gazimagomedov
|style="font-size:88%"|1–3
|style="font-size:88%" rowspan=5|January 23–26, 2020
|style="font-size:88%" rowspan=5|Golden Grand Prix Ivan Yarygin 2020
|style="text-align:left;font-size:88%;" rowspan=5|
 Krasnoyarsk, Russia
|-
|Win
|61–8
|align=left| Magomed Kurbanaliev
|style="font-size:88%"|8–0
|-
|Win
|60–8
|align=left| Nurkozha Kaipanov
|style="font-size:88%"|8–7
|-
|Win
|59–8
|align=left| Timur Bizhoev
|style="font-size:88%"|4–0
|-
|Win
|58–8
|align=left| Magomed Khizriev
|style="font-size:88%"|7–2
|-
! style=background:white colspan=7 |
|-
|Win
|57–8
|align=left| Mohammad Nokhodi
|style="font-size:88%"|8–1
|style="font-size:88%" rowspan=5|October 29–30, 2019 
|style="font-size:88%" rowspan=5|2019 U23 World Championships
|style="text-align:left;font-size:88%;" rowspan=5|
 Budapest, Hungary
|-
|Win
|56–8
|align=left| Giorgi Sulava
|style="font-size:88%"|15–7
|-
|Win
|55–8
|align=left| Fazli Eryilmaz
|style="font-size:88%"|10–2
|-
|Win
|54–8
|align=left| Gourav Baliyan
|style="font-size:88%"|12–9
|-
|Win
|53–8
|align=left| Brady Berge
|style="font-size:88%"|5–1
|-
! style=background:white colspan=7 |
|-
|Win
|52–8
|align=left| Timur Bizhoev
|style="font-size:88%"|4–2
|style="font-size:88%" rowspan=5|September 27–28, 2019
|style="font-size:88%" rowspan=5|2019 U23 All–Russian Yuri Gusov Memorial
|style="text-align:left;font-size:88%;" rowspan=5|
 Vladikavkaz, Russia
|-
|Win
|51–8
|align=left| Nikita Suchkov
|style="font-size:88%"|TF 13–2
|-
|Win
|50–8
|align=left| Tazret Tuskaev
|style="font-size:88%"|TF 11–0
|-
|Win
|49–8
|align=left| Alimbek Aydinov
|style="font-size:88%"|TF 10–0
|-
|Win
|48–8
|align=left| Soslan Kaloev
|style="font-size:88%"|TF 10–0
|-
! style=background:white colspan=7 |
|-
|Loss
|47–8
|align=left| David Baev
|style="font-size:88%"|10–10
|style="font-size:88%" rowspan=5|July 4, 2019
|style="font-size:88%" rowspan=5|2019 Russian National Championships
|style="text-align:left;font-size:88%;" rowspan=5|
 Sochi, Russia
|-
|Win
|47–7
|align=left| Abdullagadzhi Magomedov
|style="font-size:88%"|7–0
|-
|Win
|46–7
|align=left| Magomedkhabib Kadimagomedov
|style="font-size:88%"|13–7
|-
|Win
|45–7
|align=left| Chermen Valiev
|style="font-size:88%"|5–0
|-
|Win
|44–7
|align=left| Khalid Eldarbiev
|style="font-size:88%"|TF 11–0
|-
! style=background:white colspan=7 |
|-
|Win
|43–7
|align=left| Gitinomagomed Gadzhiev
|style="font-size:88%"|8–0
|style="font-size:88%" rowspan=5|May 1–3, 2019
|style="font-size:88%" rowspan=5|2019 Ali Aliev Memorial International
|style="text-align:left;font-size:88%;" rowspan=5|
 Kaspiysk, Russia
|-
|Win
|42–7
|align=left| Chermen Valiev
|style="font-size:88%"|TF 11–0
|-
|Win
|41–7
|align=left| Murtazali Muslimov
|style="font-size:88%"|TF 10–0
|-
|Win
|40–7
|align=left| Temuujin Mendbileg
|style="font-size:88%"|TF 10–0
|-
|Win
|39–7
|align=left| Joshgun Azimov
|style="font-size:88%"|4–0
|-
! style=background:white colspan=7 |
|-
|Win
|38–7
|align=left| Patryk Olenczyn
|style="font-size:88%"|Fall
|style="font-size:88%" rowspan=4|March 4–10, 2019
|style="font-size:88%" rowspan=4|2019 U23 European Continental Championships
|style="text-align:left;font-size:88%;" rowspan=4|
 Novi Sad, Serbia
|-
|Win
|37–7
|align=left| Vasile Diacon
|style="font-size:88%"|TF 10–0
|-
|Win
|36–7
|align=left| Oleksii Boruta
|style="font-size:88%"|7–1
|-
|Win
|35–7
|align=left| Daud Ibragimov
|style="font-size:88%"|TF 11–1
|-
! style=background:white colspan=7 |
|-
|Win
|34–7
|align=left| David Baev
|style="font-size:88%"|8–4
|style="font-size:88%" rowspan=3|January 24, 2019
|style="font-size:88%" rowspan=3|Golden Grand Prix Ivan Yarygin 2019
|style="text-align:left;font-size:88%;" rowspan=3|
 Krasnoyarsk, Russia
|-
|Win
|33–7
|align=left| Jason Chamberlain
|style="font-size:88%"|8–2
|-
|Loss
|32–7
|align=left| Magomedrasul Gazimagomedov
|style="font-size:88%"|0–6
|-
! style=background:white colspan=7 |
|-
|Win
|32–6
|align=left| Ruslan Bogatyrev
|style="font-size:88%"|TF 11–0
|style="font-size:88%" rowspan=5|December 7–9, 2018
|style="font-size:88%" rowspan=5|2018 Alans International
|style="text-align:left;font-size:88%;" rowspan=5|
 Vladikavkaz, Russia
|-
|Loss
|31–6
|align=left| Magomed Kurbanaliev
|style="font-size:88%"|3–4
|-
|Win
|31–5
|align=left| Vladislav Dyshekov
|style="font-size:88%"|8–3
|-
|Win
|30–5
|align=left| Mohammad Yousefi Kamangar
|style="font-size:88%"|TF 12–1
|-
|Win
|29–5
|align=left| Abdullagadzhi Magomedov
|style="font-size:88%"|TF 13–0
|-
! style=background:white colspan=7 |
|-
|Win
|28–5
|align=left| Enkhtuya Temuulen
|style="font-size:88%"|Fall
|style="font-size:88%" rowspan=2|November 23–26, 2018
|style="font-size:88%" rowspan=2|2018 Akhmat Kadyrov Cup
|style="text-align:left;font-size:88%;" rowspan=2|
 Grozny, Russia
|-
|Win
|27–5
|align=left| Adilet Anarbekov
|style="font-size:88%"|TF 11–0
|-
! style=background:white colspan=7 |
|-
|Win
|26–5
|align=left| Aghahuseyn Mustafayev
|style="font-size:88%"|8–4
|style="font-size:88%" rowspan=4|November 15–19, 2018
|style="font-size:88%" rowspan=4|2018 Intercontinental Cup
|style="text-align:left;font-size:88%;" rowspan=4|
 Khasavyurt, Russia
|-
|Win
|25–5
|align=left| Abutalim Gamzaev
|style="font-size:88%"|Fall
|-
|Win
|24–5
|align=left| Anzor Zakuev
|style="font-size:88%"|8–3
|-
|Win
|23–5
|align=left| Artem Auga
|style="font-size:88%"|TF 10–0
|-
! style=background:white colspan=7 |
|-
|Loss
|22–5
|align=left| David Baev
|style="font-size:88%"|3–4
|style="font-size:88%" rowspan=5|August 3–4, 2018
|style="font-size:88%" rowspan=5|2018 Russian National Championships
|style="text-align:left;font-size:88%;" rowspan=5|
 Odintsovo, Russia
|-
|Loss
|22–4
|align=left| Magomedrasul Gazimagomedov
|style="font-size:88%"|1–2
|-
|Win
|22–3
|align=left| Anzor Zakuev
|style="font-size:88%"|8–1
|-
|Win
|21–3
|align=left| Alibek Akbaev
|style="font-size:88%"|TF 10–0
|-
|Win
|20–3
|align=left| Magomedkhan Tinamagomedov
|style="font-size:88%"|TF 10–0
|-
! style=background:white colspan=7 |
|-
|Win
|19–3
|align=left| Vasile Diacon
|style="font-size:88%"|Fall
|style="font-size:88%" rowspan=4|March 2–4, 2018
|style="font-size:88%" rowspan=4|2018 Roman Dmitriev Memorial International
|style="text-align:left;font-size:88%;" rowspan=4|
 Yakutsk, Russia
|-
|Win
|18–3
|align=left| Nurkozha Kaipanov
|style="font-size:88%"|TF 13–3
|-
|Win
|17–3
|align=left| Stiv Popov
|style="font-size:88%"|TF 10–0
|-
|Win
|16–3
|align=left| Kirill Korneev
|style="font-size:88%"|Fall
|-
! style=background:white colspan=7 |
|-
|Win
|15–3
|align=left| Valodya Frangulyan
|style="font-size:88%"|10–6
|style="font-size:88%" rowspan=4|October 7–8, 2017
|style="font-size:88%" rowspan=4|2017 Stepan Sargsyan Cup
|style="text-align:left;font-size:88%;" rowspan=4|
 Vanadzor, Armenia
|-
|Win
|14–3
|align=left| Narek Sirunyan
|style="font-size:88%"|13–7
|-
|Win
|13–3
|align=left| Vardges Karapetyan
|style="font-size:88%"|TF 10–0
|-
|Win
|12–3
|align=left| Gor Sirekanyan
|style="font-size:88%"|TF 12–2
|-
! style=background:white colspan=7 |
|-
|Loss
|11–3
|align=left| Islam Mazhitov
|style="font-size:88%"|5–6
|style="font-size:88%" rowspan=2|September 16–17, 2017
|style="font-size:88%" rowspan=2|2017 Aleksandr Medved Prizes
|style="text-align:left;font-size:88%;" rowspan=2|
 Minsk, Belarus
|-
|Win
|11–2
|align=left| Magomed Surkhoev
|style="font-size:88%"|TF 10–0
|-
! style=background:white colspan=7 |
|-
|Win
|10–2
|align=left| Temuulen Enkhtuya
|style="font-size:88%"|TF 10–0
|style="font-size:88%" rowspan=4|March 4–5, 2017
|style="font-size:88%" rowspan=4|2017 Roman Dmitriev Memorial International
|style="text-align:left;font-size:88%;" rowspan=4|
 Yakutsk, Russia
|-
|Win
|9–2
|align=left| Nurgustan Broshchev
|style="font-size:88%"|TF 10–0
|-
|Win
|8–2
|align=left| Egor Zakharov
|style="font-size:88%"|TF 10–0
|-
|Win
|7–2
|align=left| Aisen Romanov
|style="font-size:88%"|TF 10–0
|-
! style=background:white colspan=7 |
|-
|Loss
|6–2
|align=left| Bekkhan Goygereyev
|style="font-size:88%"|2–6
|style="font-size:88%" rowspan=3|January 28, 2017
|style="font-size:88%" rowspan=3|Golden Grand Prix Ivan Yarygin 2017
|style="text-align:left;font-size:88%;" rowspan=3|
 Krasnoyarsk, Russia
|-
|Win
|6–1
|align=left| Ruslan Zhendaev
|style="font-size:88%"|TF 10–0
|-
|Win
|5–1
|align=left| Dyulustan Bulatov
|style="font-size:88%"|3–1
|-
! style=background:white colspan=7 |
|-
|Win
|4–1
|align=left| Daulet Niyazbekov
|style="font-size:88%"|6–5
|style="font-size:88%" rowspan=3|November 14, 2016
|style="font-size:88%" rowspan=3|2016 Intercontinental Cup
|style="text-align:left;font-size:88%;" rowspan=3|
 Khasavyurt, Russia
|-
|Win
|3–1
|align=left|
|style="font-size:88%"|
|-
|Win
|2–1
|align=left|
|style="font-size:88%"|
|-
! style=background:white colspan=7 |
|-
|Loss
|1–1
|align=left| Bekkhan Goygereyev
|style="font-size:88%"|TF 0–10
|style="font-size:88%" rowspan=2|July 1–3, 2016
|style="font-size:88%" rowspan=2|2016 Ali Aliev Memorial International
|style="text-align:left;font-size:88%;" rowspan=2|
 Makhachkala, Russia
|-
|Win
|1–0
|align=left| Savr Shalburov
|style="font-size:88%"|TF 12–0
|-

References

External links 
 

1998 births
Living people
People from Khasavyurt
Russian male sport wrestlers
Sportspeople from Dagestan
20th-century Russian people
21st-century Russian people